The following television stations broadcast on digital channel 23 in Mexico:

 XEIMT-TDT in Mexico City
 XETV-TDT in Tijuana, Baja California
 XHAA-TDT in Tapachula, Chiapas
 XHAFC-TDT in San Nicolás Jacala, Hidalgo
 XHAL-TDT in Acapulco, Guerrero
 XHAUM-TDT in Autlán de Navarro, Jalisco
 XHBT-TDT in Culiacán, Sinaloa
 XHBX-TDT in Chetumal, Quintana Roo 
 XHBY-TDT in Ciudad Mante, Tamaulipas 
 XHCMZ-TDT in Comitán de Domínguez, Chiapas 
 XHCOZ-TDT in Cozumel, Quintana Roo
 XHCPBC-TDT in La Paz, Baja California Sur
 XHCPO-TDT in Concepción Pápalo, Oaxaca
 XHCTCU-TDT in Cuernavaca, Morelos
 XHGSM-TDT in San Miguel de Allende, Guanajuato 
 XHGTI-TDT in Tierra Blanca, Guanajuato 
 XHHES-TDT in Hermosillo, Sonora
 XHIB-TDT in Taxco de Alarcón, Guerrero 
 XHIDC-TDT in Isla de Cedros, Baja California 
 XHIMN-TDT in Islas Marías, Nayarit 
 XHIT-TDT in Chihuahua, Chihuahua 
 XHJP-TDT in Puerto Escondido, Oaxaca 
 XHKYU-TDT in Valladolid, Yucatán 
 XHL-TDT in León, Guanajuato
 XHLNA-TDT in Nuevo Laredo, Tamaulipas
 XHMIO-TDT in Miahuatlán de Porfirio Díaz, Oaxaca
 XHMZ-TDT in Mazatlán, Sinaloa 
 XHNOZ-TDT in Nochistlán, Zacatecas 
 XHOAH-TDT in Torreón, Coahuila
 XHPBGD-TDT in Guadalajara, Jalisco
 XHPVJ-TDT in Puerto Vallarta, Jalisco 
 XHRAM-TDT in Zamora, Michoacán
 XHRDC-TDT in Nueva Rosita, Coahuila
 XHS-TDT in Ensenada, Baja California
 XHSMI-TDT in Santa María Ixcatlan, Oaxaca
 XHSMZ-TDT in Sombrerete, Zacatecas
 XHSPRME-TDT in Mérida, Yucatán
 XHSPS-TDT in San Luis Potosí, San Luis Potosí
 XHTEC-TDT in Armería, Colima 
 XHTLX-TDT in Tlaxcala, Tlaxcala
 XHTOH-TDT in Tepeapulco, Hidalgo 
 XHTXM-TDT in Huamantla, Tlaxcala
 XHVIH-TDT in Villahermosa, Tabasco
 XHX-TDT in Monterrey, Nuevo León

23